Nová Ves is a municipality and village in Mělník District in the Central Bohemian Region of the Czech Republic. It has about 1,000 inhabitants.

Administrative parts
Villages of Miřejovice, Nové Ouholice, Staré Ouholice and Vepřek are administrative parts of Nová Ves.

History
The first written mention of Nová Ves is from 1421.

Economy
Vepřek Solar Park, the largest photovoltaic power station by area and the second biggest by nameplate capacity, is located in Vepřek.

Sights
There are four cultural monuments in the municipality: Church of the Nativity of the Blessed Virgin Mary, a belfry in Nová Ves, a belfry in Vepřek and a watermill in Vepřek.

Galery

References

Villages in Mělník District